2-Methyl-3-phenylpiperidine is an intermediate in the preparation of 3-aminopiperidine substance P antagonists.

References

Substituted amphetamines
Piperidines